The rozhok is an ancient Russian wooden trumpet, a relative of the cornett, which has remained in continuous use until the present day. It is also known as Vladimirskiy rozhok, (meaning "Vladimir horn").

Names 

The origins of the instrument date to before AD 1600.  The tradition of playing the rozhok in an ensemble probably dates to a much earlier time.  It is possible that the name rozhok was used for the instrument later, and that in the earliest written sources it was simply called a pipe. A rozhok can be called be various names: shepherd's horn, Russian horn, or song horn.  At the end of the 19th century, the name Vladimir was added to this instrument's name (Vladimirskiy rozhok, "Vladimir horn"), due to the success of a chorus of rozhok players under the leadership of Nikolai Vasilyevich Kondratyev from the Vladimir region.

Structure 
A rozhok is a conical straight tube with the six playing holes: five on top and one underneath.  The total length of a rozhok ranges from 320 to 830 mm (13" to 33").  A mouthpiece is cut in the form of a small cup, and the lower end of the tube is shaped like a conical bell. A rozhok is usually made of birch, maple, or juniper.  Musicians say that rozhoks of juniper have the best sound.  In the past they were made in the same manner as a shepherd's rozhok, in which two halves are fastened together with birch bark; today they are turned. The sound of a rozhok is strong, but mellow, having a range of about an octave, or a little more.  There are several types of rozhoks: the shortest one, having the highest sound is called vizgunok (squeaker), typically in F# or G; the longest and thus the lowest one is called bas (bass), in F# or G an octave below, while a mid-size instrument is called a polubasok (half-bass), typically in C. It is polubasok instruments that are most frequently used for solo playing. Rozhok ensembles usually consist of just vizgunok and bas instruments in the ratio 2:1 (twice as many high-pitched horns).

Varieties 
Rozhok's folk tunes are divided into four stylistic varieties: signal, song, dancing, and dance, with a large number of songs in all styles.  There are several types of shepherd's signals and more of others.  The main repertoire is song folk-tunes.

As of 2015, rozhok ensembles exist in Moscow, Vladimir and Nerekhta. In addition, rozhoks can sometimes be heard in Russian folk orchestra concerts.

See also
 Timeline of Russian inventions and technology records

References

External links 
Sound sample
An article in Russian and photos
A video documentary about Vladimirskiy Rozhok - from a series "Странствия музыканта" by Sergey Starostin 

Russian musical instruments
Russian inventions
Russian folk music
Woodwind instruments

ru:Рожок